Caste discrimination in the United States is a form of discrimination based on the social hierarchy which is determined by a person's birth. Though the use of the term caste is more prevalent in South Asia and Bali, in the United States, Indian Americans also use the term caste.

Caste is not officially recognized by law in the United States, except in Seattle, Washington; on February 21, 2023, Seattle became the first U.S. jurisdiction to add caste to its list of categories protected against discrimination. The existence of caste discrimination in the US tech sector was also acknowledged by a group of Dalit female engineers from Microsoft, Google, Apple and other tech companies. In 2021, the student body of California State University system passed a resolution against caste discrimination.

Overview

History of caste in the United States 
Caste is a birth-based social stratification system.

Historically, the dominant caste Hindus and Sikhs have been the ones to acquire citizenship in America. In 1923, A.K. Mozumdar and Bhagat Singh Thind argued that they passed the whiteness test because they were caste Hindus and had pure "Aryan" blood.

In 1910, the Asiatic Exclusion League argued that Asian Indians should be denied citizenship through naturalization. The league described Hindu ancestry as "enslaved, effeminate, caste ridden, and degraded" and Hindus as the "slaves of Creation".
Such racist rhetoric formed the idea of the "Hindoo invasion", an iteration of the "Yellow Peril." In 1953, W. Norman Brown, founder of the Department of South Asian Studies at the University of Pennsylvania, wrote that "a large number of Americans...have a picture of India ... where everyone is a beggar and caste is more important than life".

In recent times, caste discrimination has followed the immigrants to the US from India, Nepal and other south Asian countries. It has been mostly underreported despite its influence on job opportunities and marriage prospects among south Asian immigrants.

Legal position 
Caste is not officially recognized by law as a category of discrimination in the United States,
since caste discrimination was not a known phenomenon.
It has come to light only in recent times due to reported incidents of discrimination.  There have been earlier attempts to get institutions recognize the discrimination related to caste.

However, the California law bars discrimination on the basis on ancestry. Dalit lawyers believe that caste discrimination is covered under it.
Legal scholars have also argued that caste discrimination is cognizable as race discrimination, religious discrimination and national origin discrimination.

In August 2002, the UN Committee for the Elimination of Racial Discrimination approved a resolution condemning caste or descent-based discrimination.

In February, 2023, Seattle became the first city in the United States to ban discrimination based on caste.

Studies on caste in the United States 
The oppressed castes of South Asia, known as Dalits, form 1.5% of all Indian immigrants to the United States, according to a University of Pennsylvania study carried out in 2003.  The 'high' or 'dominant' castes make up more than 90% of Indian migrants as per a study in 2016.

A survey on caste discrimination conducted by Equality Labs
found 67% of Indian Dalits living in the US reporting that they faced caste-based harassment at the workplace, and 27% reporting verbal or physical assault based on their caste. The survey also documents personal anecdotes about discrimination and isolation at schools, workplaces, temples and within communities. The Carnegie Endowment researchers  pointed out that the study used a non-representative snowball sampling method to identify participants, which might have skewed the results in favour of those with strong views about caste.

A study conducted by a project of the Carnegie Endowment for International Peace, using a sample from YouGov, found 5% of the Indian Americans reporting they faced caste discrimination. A third of them said that they faced discrimination from other Indian Americans, another third said they faced it from non-Indian Americans, and a final third said that they faced it from both Indian and non-Indian Americans. The researchers found this response perplexing as non-Indians would not have had caste as a salient category.

Forty-seven percent of the Hindu respondents in the Carnegie study said that they identify with a caste; the percentage was 53% for foreign-born respondents and 34% for American-born respondents. The researchers comment that, on the whole, the majority do not identify with caste, and this is much more so for American-born Hindu Americans.

Homophily based on caste, i.e., tendency to associate with the people of the same caste, was reported by 21% of the respondents; 24% said that they did not know the caste of the people they associated with. The remainder said that they associate with some or most people of their caste (23% and 31% respectively.

The Ambedkar King Study Circle collected testimonies of how caste consciousness and discrimination are practiced by the Indian Diaspora. The testimonies record various types of discriminatory practices in schools, workplaces, social gatherings and neighborhoods. Usually this discrimination borders on the sense of notional and real 'untouchability'.

Dalits in the United States

African Americans and dalits 
Lower caste activists in India have found common ground with the struggles of African Americans in the US. The lower caste activist body Dalit Panthers was formed taking inspiration from Black Panther Party. Martin Luther King Jr. too had an empathetic association with the untouchables in India, and when he visited India in 1959 he said, "Yes, I am an untouchable, and every negro in the United States of America is an untouchable."

Discrimination in the workplace 
The existence of caste discrimination in the US tech sector was acknowledged by group of Dalit female engineers from Microsoft, Google, Apple and other tech companies.

The Ambedkar King Study Circle (AKSC), a US based activists group, along with 15 other organizations intervened to send an appeal to top American companies including Google, Apple, Microsoft demanding that the CEOs intervene immediately to address the issue of caste discrimination. The AKSC wanted the companies to bring in caste sensitivity training similar to the gender, race, sexuality training practices.  AKSC emphasized the fair and equal opportunity recruitment, retention and appraisal policies. 

In May 2021, the Federal Bureau of Investigation raided Akshardham in Robbinsville Township, New Jersey to investigate forced labor of lower caste Indian workers.
The workers were brought on religious visa and the FBI removed about 90 workers from the site.

In April 2022, Google cancelled a planned talk by Thenmozhi Soundararajan as part of its Diversity Equity Inclusivity programme. It was allegedly done under pressure from pro-Hindu groups within the company, who claimed that their "lives were at risk by the discussion of caste equity". They also claimed that caste equity was a form of reverse discrimination against the upper castes. The senior Google employee who invited Soundararajan is said to have been slapped with punitive action and resigned.

Cisco lawsuit 
In 2020, the caste based discrimination in Silicon Valley came to surface with a lawsuit by California against Cisco Systems filed by the California Department of Fair Employment and Housing (DFEH). The DFEH sued Cisco and two of its employees for discrimination against a Dalit engineer, who alleged that he received lower wages and fewer opportunities because of his caste.
The DFEH originally filed the case in the U.S. District Court for Northern California. In October 2021 it withdrew the filing and refiled it with the California Supreme Court.
Cisco filed a demurrer asking to dismiss the case on the grounds that caste and ethnicity are not protected classes under the Fair Employment and Housing Act of California. The Ambedkar International Center and other Dalit organisatioins filed an amicus curiae brief as a party interested in the outcome of the case, arguing that the California law does in fact prohibit caste discrimination.

Discrimination in education
In 2015, California State Board of Education initiated a regular ten-year public review of the school curriculum framework. The Hindu American Foundation (HAF) and a coalition of other Hindu activists sought to literally erase the word "dalit" from the syllabus, which was contested by a coalition of interfaith, multi-racial, inter-caste groups called "South Asian Histories for All".

In 2021, the student body of California State University system, representing half a million students, passed a resolution seeking a ban on caste-based discrimination.
The campaign was spearheaded by Prem Pariyar, a Nepali origin Dalit student, who came to the US in 2015 escaping persecution in his home country, and claimed that he faced discrimination in the US as well. For the affected students, casteism is manifested through slurs, microaggressions and social exclusion.
The resolution cited the survey by Equality Labs where 25 percent of Dalits  reported having faced verbal or physical assaults.
Al Jazeera noted that the resolution was authored by a higher caste student and backed by other students from other racial and religious groups.

In January 2022, the Board of Trustees of the California State University  responded, announcing that they added "caste" as a protected category in the University's anti-discrimination policy.
The change was subtle, according to CNN. The word "caste" was added in parentheses after the term "race and ethnicity".
A group of faculty in the University had written to the Board of Trustees citing lack of "due diligence" in instituting the measure. They said that the existing policy of the University, which covers national origin, ethnicity and ancestry, already provided adequate protection, and claimed that the new measure would result in singling out and targeting the Hindu faculty.
But for the advocates and student leaders who campaigned for it for over two years, it was a civil rights victory.

In December 2022, Brown University became the first Ivy League institution to add caste to its nondiscrimination policy. Brown's Vice President for Institutional Equity and Diversity noted that caste was covered under existing nondiscrimination policies, "but we felt it was important to lift this up and explicitly express a position on caste equity.”

See also
Caste system among South Asian Muslims
Caste system in India
Caste system in Nepal
Caste system in Sri Lanka
Discrimination in the United States
Racism in the United States

Notes

References

 Sources

Further reading
 
 Isabel Wilkerson, Caste: The Origins of Our Discontents'', Random House, 2020

Caste system in India
 
Discrimination in India
Discrimination in the United States
Racism in the United States
United States caste system